Dalton Castle may refer to:

Dalton Castle, Cumbria
Dalton Castle (wrestler)